Maxie McCullagh (21 June 1922 – 30 March 2001) was an Irish boxer. He competed in the men's lightweight event at the 1948 Summer Olympics. In his first two fights at the Olympics, he beat Tauno Rinkinen and Ron Cooper, before losing to Svend Wad in the quarterfinals.

References

1922 births
2001 deaths
Irish male boxers
Olympic boxers of Ireland
Boxers at the 1948 Summer Olympics
Place of birth missing
Lightweight boxers